The 2011 National Premier Soccer League season was the 9th season of the NPSL. The regular season began on April 1, 2011, and ended on July 17. The playoffs concluded with the NPSL Championship Game, which was held at the home of Rocket City United in Madison, Alabama on July 30.

Jacksonville United ended the season as national champions, beating the Hollywood United Hitmen 3-2 in the 2011 NPSL Championship game. Jacksonville were the lowest seeded-team in the playoffs, having finished champions of the Southeast Division with a 6-0-4 record after starting their campaign with four straight losses, and beat number one seed and Northeast Division champions Erie Admirals on their way to the final. Both Jacksonville and Hollywood were first-year NPSL teams, although Hollywood had previously spent two seasons playing in the USL Premier Development League.

The Erie Admirals had the best regular season record, with a points-per-game average of 2.583, just ahead of the Hollywood United Hitmen (2.429) and FC Sonic Lehigh Valley (2.417), who were in such a strong division they did not even qualify for the post-season.

Jacksonville striker Tommy Krizanovic scored a hat trick in the NPSL final, and was named MVP of the championship tournament.

Changes From 2010

Name Changes/Rebrands 
 Atlanta FC formed a partnership with the NASL Atlanta Silverbacks franchise and became Atlanta Silverbacks Reserves

New Franchises 
13 franchises were announced as joining the league this year:

Folding
Six teams have been announced as leaving the league prior to the beginning of the season:
Boston Tea Men 
Long Island Academy 
TSC Maryland Red Devils 
New Hampshire Mountaineers 
Pumas FC 
Southern Oregon Fuego 
FC Tulsa

Standings
Purple indicates division title clinched
Green indicates playoff berth clinched

Northeast Division - Atlantic Conference

Northeast Division - Keystone Conference

Southeast Division

*Note: Jacksonville finished ahead of Georgia as NPSL rules state that the second tiebreaker after total points is number of victories. FC Tulsa chose not to compete in league play in 2011, and only played in the US Open Cup qualification tournament.

Midwest Division

West Division - Flight Northwest

West Division - Flight Southwest

Source:

NPSL Playoffs

Format

Bracket

Northeast Division Playoffs

West Division Playoffs

NPSL Championship Tournament

Semi-finals

Third Place Playoff

NPSL All-Star Game

NPSL Championship Game

Award Winners and Conference Teams
MVP: Tommy Krizanovic (JAC)

NPSL All-Star Team
F: Jumol Harewood (GEO), Jose Miranda (HOL), Justin Picou (SDB), Afrim Latifi (ERI), Chris Tsonis (SEA)
M: Cody Antonini (SLV), Carlington Lamont (REA), Carlos McCrary (MAD), Kingsley Morgan (ATL), Anthony Santaga (MAD), Billy Sweatra (ACC), Tyler Williams (JAC)
D: Peassio Denev (ECA), Adrian Kawuba (MAS), Marcos Mendez (GEO), Joseph Omondi (RCU), Corey Phillips (BUF), Dan Sauerhoff (MCC), Andy Stewart (CFC)
G: Zach Brunner (LAN), Thomas Hunter (CFC)

2011 National Championship Best 11
F: Tommy Krizanovic (JAC), Brent Whitfield (HOL)
M: Arturo Albarrán (HOL), Gavin Falconer (ERI), Amilcar Herrera (MIL), Shane Howard (ERI), Ramak Safi (JAC)
D: Jacobi Goodfellow (JAC), Garrett Teague (JAC), Marcus Watson (HOL)
G: Stuart McCrory (JAC)

U.S. Open Cup Qualifying
Four NPSL clubs gained berths to the 2011 U.S. Open Cup, one each from the Northeast, Southeast, Midwest and West divisions.

Northeast Division

Southeast Division

First round

Second round

Final

Midwest Division
Madison 56ers were granted the automatic berth for the Midwest Division by virtue of their 2010 division championship. The Midwest was the only NPSL division granting its 2011 U.S. Open Cup berth based on performance in the 2010 season.

West Division
The Hollywood United Hitmen were given the berth for the West Division as a result of being the team with the best record over the first seven games of the 2011 regular season.

References

2011
4